Trechus arribasi is a species of space beetle in the subfamily Trechinae. It was described by Jeanne in 1988.

References

arribasi
Beetles described in 1988